Trevor Randall (born 20 August 1940) is a former  Australian rules footballer who played with Hawthorn in the Victorian Football League (VFL).

Randall captain-coached Rochester to runners up in 1964 and 1965 in the Bendigo Football League. 

His father, Viv Randall also played for Hawthorn, and his granddaughter, Pepa Randall plays football in the AFL Women's league.

Notes

External links 

Living people
1940 births
Australian rules footballers from Victoria (Australia)
Hawthorn Football Club players